Kam To is one of the 36 constituencies of the Sha Tin District Council. The seat elects one member of the council every four years. It was first created in 2003.

Councillors represented

Election results

2010s

2000s

References

 2011 District Council Election Results (Sha Tin)
 2007 District Council Election Results (Sha Tin)
 2003 District Council Election Results (Sha Tin)

Constituencies of Hong Kong
Constituencies of Sha Tin District Council
2003 establishments in Hong Kong
Constituencies established in 2003
Ma On Shan